Ponce Inlet is a town in Volusia County, Florida, United States. The population was 3,032 at the 2010 census.

The town of Ponce Inlet is located on the southern tip of a barrier island, south of Daytona Beach and Daytona Beach Shores.

Several marinas are located in Ponce Inlet. The community is known for its strict land use regulations.

Lighthouse

Completed in 1887, replacing the former lighthouse (built in 1835, it had collapsed into the inlet the following year), the Ponce de Leon Inlet Light Station was built when the area was known as Mosquito Inlet. After decades of restoration by the Ponce de Leon Inlet Lighthouse Preservation Association, it stands today as one of the best preserved light stations in the nation.

Visited by over 80,000 people each year, the Ponce de Leon Inlet Light Station was designated a National Historic Landmark in 1998. The Ponce Inlet Lighthouse is the tallest lighthouse in Florida and the second tallest lighthouse in the nation. Visitors who climb the  lighthouse tower are treated to a view of the Florida coastline and Halifax River from Daytona Beach to New Smyrna Beach.

The lighthouse keepers' dwellings and other historic light station buildings are now home to the lighthouse museum, with exhibits on lighthouse life, lighthouse and Fresnel lens restoration, the keepers and their families, Daytona Beach and Florida history, and shipwrecks. The Ayres Davies Lens Exhibit Building houses one of the finest collections of restored Fresnel lenses in the world, including the rotating first order Fresnel lens from the Cape Canaveral lighthouse and the restored original Ponce Inlet lighthouse first-order Fresnel lens.

Geography

Ponce Inlet lies on a peninsula at  (29.094744, –80.942599), adjacent to the Ponce de León Inlet, and between the Halifax River and Atlantic Ocean.

Local government

Ponce Inlet is organized with a council-manager form of government; voters elect a Town Council, which consists of five members who serve two-year staggered terms. All five seats including the Mayor are town-wide; there are no districted seats. The Town Council establishes ordinances and policies for the town. It also reviews and approves the town budget annually. The Council appoints a Town Manager, who implements policy as voted on by the council. The town manager is the senior administrative official of the town, and is responsible for all aspects of administrative oversight.

Local elected officials

 Mayor, Seat 1 – Lois Paritsky
 Vice-Mayor Seat 5 – Gary Smith
 Councilmember Seat 3 – Elizabeth Caswell
 Councilmember Seat 4 – Joseph Villanella
 Councilmember Seat 2 – Bill Milano
 Town Manager – Michael Disher, Interim

Federal, state and county representation

Ponce Inlet is in the 24th Congressional District and is part of Florida's 27th Legislative District.

Demographics

As of the census of 2010, there were 3,032  people, 1,206 households, and 883 families residing in the town. Census population estimate for 2006 was 3192. The racial makeup of the town was 97.73% White, 0.60% African American, 0.24% Native American, 0.72% Asian, 0.04% Pacific Islander, 0.16% from other races, and 0.52% from two or more races. Hispanic or Latino of any race were 1.55% of the population.

There were 1,206 households, out of which 11.9% had children under the age of 18 living with them, 65.9% were married couples living together, 5.1% had a female householder with no husband present, and 26.7% were non-families. 21.9% of all households were made up of individuals, and 10.1% had someone living alone who was 65 years of age or older.  The average household size was 2.08 and the average family size was 2.38.

In the town, the population was spread out, with 10.1% under the age of 18, 3.2% from 18 to 24, 15.6% from 25 to 44, 38.2% from 45 to 64, and 32.9% who were 65 years of age or older.  The median age was 57 years. For every 100 females, there were 95.0 males.  For every 100 females age 18 and over, there were 93.3 males.

The median income for a household in the town was $52,112, and the median income for a family was $58,828. Males had a median income of $42,188 versus $31,989 for females. The per capita income for the town was $36,518.  About 3.7% of families and 5.1% of the population were below the poverty line, including 8.8% of those under age 18 and 3.1% of those age 65 or over.

Points of interest

 Marine Science Center
 Ponce de Leon Inlet Light

References

External links

 Town of Ponce Inlet official website
 

Towns in Volusia County, Florida
Populated places established in 1963
Towns in Florida
Populated coastal places in Florida on the Atlantic Ocean
Beaches of Volusia County, Florida
Beaches of Florida